Sharon Bala (born April 3, 1979) is a Canadian writer residing in St. John's, Newfoundland and Labrador.

Her debut novel, The Boat People, won the 2015 Percy Janes First Novel Award for unpublished manuscripts. It was later published by McClelland and Stewart and Doubleday in January 2018. The book was internationally publicized as part of Penguin Random House's One World, One Book campaign.

The book was selected for the 2018 edition of Canada Reads, where it was defended by Mozhdah Jamalzadah. It won the Harper Lee Prize for Legal Fiction, was a finalist for the 2018 amazon.ca First Novel Award, and was shortlisted for the 2015 Fresh Fish Award for Emerging Writers and the 2019 Thomas Head Raddall Award.

Bala was the winner of the 2017 Journey Prize for her short story "Butter Tea at Starbucks", and was longlisted for the 2017 National Magazine Award for fiction for her short story "Miloslav". Her short fiction has appeared in Hazlitt, Grain, The Dalhousie Review, Riddle Fence, Room, Prism International, Maisonneuve, Joyland, The New Quarterly, and in an anthology called Racket: New Writing From Newfoundland.

Awards
2015 Percy Janes First Novel Award for The Boat People
2017 Journey Prize for "Butter Tea at Starbucks," published in The New Quarterly

Bibliography
 The Boat People (2018)

References 

21st-century Canadian short story writers
21st-century Canadian novelists
21st-century Canadian women writers
Canadian women short story writers
Canadian women novelists
Writers from St. John's, Newfoundland and Labrador
Sri Lankan emigrants to Canada
Living people
Canadian writers of Asian descent
1979 births